Mega Girl or MegaGirl may refer to:
 The protagonist of the webcomic Strong Female Protagonist
 A character in the musical Starship
 A character in the animated television series Captain N: The Game Master